Agora is a political party in Belgium in the Brussels Region. The party does not have a typical political platform, instead focusing on the single issue of participatory democracy. The party seeks to establish a citizens' assembly representing the Brussels population that would deliberate on local issues. In the 2019 regional elections, the party won a single seat in the Brussels Parliament.

References 

Political parties in Belgium